The 1964 International Cross Country Championships was held in Dublin, Ireland, at the Leopardstown Racecourse on March 21, 1964. A report on the men's event was given in the Glasgow Herald.

Complete results for men, junior men, medallists 
  and the results of British athletes were published.

Medallists

Individual Race Results

Men's (7.3 mi / 11.8 km)

Junior Men's (4.7 mi / 7.5 km)

Team Results

Men's

Junior Men's

Participation 
An unofficial count yields the participation of 113 athletes from 9 countries.

 (14)
 (14)
 (9)
 (14)
 (14)
 (7)
 (14)
 (14)
 (13)

See also 
 1964 in athletics (track and field)

References 

International Cross Country Championships
International Cross Country Championships
International Cross Country Championships
Cross
Cross country running in Ireland
Cross
1960s in Dublin (city)
Athletics in Dublin (city)